Kristjan Raud (22 October 1865, Kirikuküla, Vinni Parish – 19 May 1943, Tallinn) was an Estonian symbolist painter and illustrator who was one of the founders of the Estonian National Museum. Folklore elements figure heavily in his subject matter and his style is reminiscent of Primitivism. His twin brother, Paul, also became a well-known painter.

Biography 
Raud and his brother spent their early years in Meriküla, where their father was a field ranger. After his early death, they were enrolled at the parish school in Rakvere, where they were taught in German. Later, he went to the teachers' college in Tartu, and taught in the local schools there for several years.

In 1892, dissatisfied with his career, he moved to Saint Petersburg, where his drawings came to the attention of Johann Köler. He thought that Raud had some potential and advised him to enroll at the Imperial Academy of Arts. Four years later, after completing his studies, he went to Germany to polish his skills; spending time in Düsseldorf with Peter Janssen, then moving on to Munich, where he took private lessons from Anton Ažbe and classes at the Academy of Fine Arts. 

When he returned to Tartu, he organized a school for young artists, wrote articles for the local newspapers, and taught at the gymnasium. After the death of Jakob Hurt in 1907, he became an advocate for the establishment of a museum devoted to folklore. Two years later, he became one of the founders and organizers of the Estonian National Museum. The following year, he provided illustrations for the collected poems of Juhan Liiv.

At the beginning of World War I, he moved to Tallinn to live with his brother. Once again, he became a teacher while continuing to paint. In 1919, he completed The Maiden of the Grave, was elected Chairman of the Estonian Museum Society and began working for the Ministry of Education. The high point of his career came in 1935, when the Estonian Literary Society issued a new edition of Kalevipoeg, the Estonian national epic, with his paintings as illustrations. The first printing ran to 10,000 copies; a very large number at the time. In 1938, he was awarded the Order of the Estonian Red Cross.

His commitment to painting was such that, even on his death bed in the hospital, he continued to paint. He died during the German occupation so, despite his fame, his funeral was very modest.

In the Spring of 1940, shortly before the Soviet occupation, a major exhibition of his works was held and the government declared it to be "Kristjan Raud Year". A monument to him was erected under the Soviet government in 1969. Four years later, the (Kristjan Raud Art Award) was established by the Estonian Artists' Association in conjunction with the city of Tallinn. As of 2012, the prize was worth 2,240 Euros. From 1992 to 2011, when Estonia adopted the Euro, Raud's likeness was on the one kroon banknote.

Selected paintings

References

Further reading
 Rasmus Kangro-Pool, Kristjan Raud, 1865-1943, Eesti NSV Kunst, 1961
 Lehti Viiroja, Kristjan Raud 1865 - 1943: looming ja mōtteavaldused, Eesti NSV Kunst, 1981

External links 

 The Kristjan Raud House Museum Collection @ Art Museums of Estonia.
 "Building up/on Power: representations of the Estonian national character in the works and words of Kristjan Raud by Elo-Hanna Seljamaa @ the Estonian Institute.
 Kristjan Raud and the Kalevipoeg @ Bifröst Museo

1865 births
1943 deaths
People from Vinni Parish
People from the Governorate of Estonia
Estonian twins
19th-century Estonian painters
19th-century Estonian male artists
20th-century Estonian painters
20th-century Estonian male artists
Burials at Rahumäe Cemetery